Gulam Hussain Bodi (born 4 January 1979) is an Indian-born South African former cricketer who represented his country at Under-19, Twenty20 and ODI level.

Cricket career
He played a left-handed batsman and slow left-arm wrist-spin bowler. Bodi has represented various teams in South African domestic cricket, Transvaal, Easterns, KwaZulu-Natal and The Titans. In June 2007 he played for an African XI in a Twenty20 game against an Asia XI and made his ODI debut in a game against Zimbabwe later in that years.

He was one of the beneficiaries of the selection policy criticized by Kevin Pietersen, forcing him from KwaZulu-Natal. However, Bodi's selection was understandable, given that in the 1999–2000 Supersport series, from four matches Pietersen only averaged 10.75 with the bat, and took 10 wickets at an expensive 37.50, which were not enough to cement his place in the KwaZulu Natal side. In the 2000–2001 season, Bodi replaced Pietersen and came second in the KwaZulu Natal batting averages with 332 runs at an average of 33.20, and was leading wicket-taker for his side that season with 27 wickets at an average of 25.81.

Corruption
In January 2016 he was charged by Cricket South Africa (CSA) under their anti-corruption code for match fixing in the 2015–16 Ram Slam T20 Challenge. On 14 January 2016 CSA confirmed that it was Bodi that was at the centre of a possible match fixing scandal, and on 25 January 2016 it was announced that he had been banned from cricket for 20 years. In November 2018, Bodi pleaded guilty to a total of eight charges of corruption, and could face up to fifteen years in prison. In October 2019, he was sentenced to five years in jail on charges of corruption.

References

External links
 

1979 births
Living people
Titans cricketers
Lions cricketers
Easterns cricketers
Gauteng cricketers
KwaZulu-Natal cricketers
South African cricketers
South Africa One Day International cricketers
South Africa Twenty20 International cricketers
Delhi Capitals cricketers
Cricketers banned for corruption